The Bradford Literature Festival (sometimes abbreviated to BLF) is a spoken and written word event that promotes literature and is held for ten days annually over June and July in Bradford, West Yorkshire, England. The first event was held in 2014 and was attended by 968 people; by the time of the 2018 event, the attendance had risen to over 70,000. The event is noted for its attendance by minority groups and writers, with over 50% of attendees coming from BAME backgrounds.

History
The Festival was started by Syima Aslam and Irna Qureshi in 2014 for a weekend. By the time of the 2017 event, they had a full-time staff of seven besides themselves with funding from Bradford Council, the Arts Council and the National Lottery. After the short weekend festival in 2014, the event was lengthened to cover ten days which was held across late June/early July for the 2017 and 2018 and 2019 festivals. The 2016 event was held in late May of that year. The festival is a series of events held at different locations across the Bradford District including theatres such as the Alhambra, bookshops, schools, colleges, Bradford City Hall, bars and art galleries. Whilst the emphasis is on the written word, some parts of the event include the arts, theatre, film, music and talks by famous people such as the former boxer, Frank Bruno, hip-hop artist Akala, 80's icon Luke Goss and former footballer John Barnes.

In 2018, as a celebration of the 200 years since Emily Brontë's birth, the festival installed four stones engraved with specially commissioned poems from four contemporary female writers, at strategic points between Thornton and Haworth. Jeanette Winterson, Carol Ann Duffy, Jackie Kay and Kate Bush have each written a piece of poetry that will adorn the four stones. The stones form a walk which connects the Bronte birthplace at Thornton, with the Bronte Parsonage Museum in Haworth.

In 2019, the festival attracted speakers such as Jeanette Winterson, Elif Shafak, John Barnes, Habib Ali al-Jifri, Luke Goss, Saul Williams, Lady Leshurr and Michael Rosen, attracting an audience of over 70,000 including a free Education Programme which reached over 18,000 young people. Approximately 15 of the 500+ booked speakers pulled out of the event when it was revealed that some of the sponsorship for the festival had come from the Home Office's Building a Stronger Britain Together programme. One of those who withdrew, journalist Hussein Kesvani, stated that if he had appeared at the festival, then it would have been a conflict of interest. Some of the young Muslims whom he had interviewed "expressed how the expansive counter-extremism programme had affected their ability to express their religious identity".

Events

References

External links
Full programme for 2018
BBC video of pupil exchange between Bradford and Hay festivals

Tourist attractions in the City of Bradford
Festivals in West Yorkshire
Literary festivals in England
Bradford